is the debut studio album by Japanese entertainer Akina Nakamori. It was released on July 1, 1982 by Warner Pioneer under the Reprise Records label. The album includes the debut single "Slow Motion". It was recorded in the Los Angeles music studio, three months before Nakamori's debut.

Background
Prologue (Jomaku) is the first studio album released in 1982, two months after the release of her debut single "Slow Motion".

The early production of the album began in February and was finished within 5 days. There were five candidate songs to be chosen as a debut single: Slow Motion, Ginga Densetsu, Anata no Portrait, T-Shirt Sunset and Jōken Hansha. From among them, Slow Motion was chosen. During that time, most of the idols had debuted with an uptempo single, while the production staff wanted to make a difference in Nakamori's case and made a debut with a slow ballad.

The music production team consisted of Motoki Funayama, siblings Etsuko and Takao Kisugi, Mayumi Shinozuka, Tsuzuru Nakasato, Yuji Ohno and Shizuka Ijūin.

Promotion

Single
The album consists of one promotional single "Slow Motion". The single itself wasn't such a huge success as the following single, Shoujo A. The single debuted at number 30 on Oricon Single Weekly Charts and charted 39 weeks.

Music home video
On May 1, 1985, a second music home video was released Hajimemashita Nakamori Akina. It was released on Nakamori's third debut anniversary. The music videoclips were filmed in the United States, mainly in Los Angeles and Santa Monica. The filming of the music home video began before her debut, between the 11th and 17th of March 1982. From the original album Prologue, was recorded Bon Voyage, Slow Motion, Ginga Densetsu and T-Shirt Sunset.

Stage performances
Akina performs Slow Motion in all of her live tours. Some of the songs were performed in the first live tour Milky Way in 1983, such as Anata no Portrait, Ginga Densetsu, and Down Town Story. Bon Voyage, Jōken Hansha, T-Shirt Sunset A-Gata Melancholy, and Imāju no Kageri were performed in the live tour Rainbow Shower in 1983.

Chart performance
The album reached number five on the Oricon Album Weekly Chart for four consecutive weeks, charted 47 weeks and sold over 453,100 copies.

Track listing

Covers
Japanese singer-songwriter Takao Kisugi covered Slow Motion in his solo album VISITORS in 1983.

References

External links
 
 
 

1982 debut albums
Akina Nakamori albums
Warner Music Japan albums
Japanese-language albums